Emre Satılmış (born 13 October 1996) is a Turkish semi-professional footballer who plays as a goalkeeper for Sivasspor.

Career
Satılmış is a youth product of Yıldırımspor, Erenlerspor and Sancaktepe. He began his professional career with Sancaktepe  in 2015, helping them earn promotion into the TFF Second League. He transferred to the Süper Lig club Sivasspor on 10 January 2022, and shortly after joined Hekimoğlu Trabzon for the rest of the 2021–22 season. Returning to Sivasspor for the 2021–22 season, He made his professional debut with them in a 2–1 Süper Lig win over Kayserispor on 22 May 2022.

Honours
Sivasspor
 Turkish Cup: 2021–22

References

External links
 
 

1996 births
Living people
Footballers from Istanbul
Turkish footballers
Association football goalkeepers
Sivasspor footballers
Süper Lig players
TFF Second League players
TFF Third League players